Douglas Michael Langdale (born August 19, 1969) is an American screenwriter, producer and actor, who mostly works on television cartoons and animated films.  He has worked with Disney numerous times, as well as the writing partner of Jorge Gutierrez.

Filmography

Writer
Dogtanian and the Three Muskehounds (2021) (film)
Maya and the Three (2021) (miniseries)
Cleopatra in Space (2020–2021) (TV series)
Vampirina (2019) (TV series)
Scooby-Doo! Shaggy's Showdown (2017) (film)
Top Cat Begins (2015) (film)
Guardians of Oz (2015) (film)
The Adventures of Puss in Boots (2015) (TV series)
The Book of Life (2014) (film)
Scooby-Doo! Stage Fright (2013) (film)
Teenage Mutant Ninja Turtles (2012) (TV series)
Big Top Scooby-Doo! (2012) (film)
Scooby-Doo! Legend of the Phantosaur (2011) (film)
Kung Fu Panda: Legends of Awesomeness (2011) (TV series)
The Looney Tunes Show (2011) (TV series)
El Tigre: The Adventures of Manny Rivera (2007) (TV series)
Happily N'Ever After (2006) (film) 
The X's (2005) (TV series)
Dave the Barbarian (2004) (TV series)
Ozzy & Drix (2002) (TV series) 
Disney's House of Mouse (2002) (TV series)
The Weekenders (2000) (TV series)
Buzz Lightyear of Star Command (2000) (TV series)
The Brothers Flub (1999) (TV series)
The Mr. Potato Head Show (1998) (TV series)
Pinky, Elmyra & the Brain (1998) (TV series)
Captain Star (1997) (TV series)
Project G.e.e.K.e.R. (1996) (TV series)
Earthworm Jim (1995) (TV series)
Quack Pack (1996) (TV series)
The Return of Jafar (1994) (film)
Darkwing Duck (1991) (TV series)

Producer
Cleopatra in Space (2019) (TV series) (executive producer)
The Adventures of Puss in Boots (2015) (TV series) (executive producer)
The Weekenders (2000) (TV series) (executive producer)
Project G.e.e.K.e.R. (1996) (TV series) (executive producer)

Creator
Earthworm Jim (1995) (TV series)
Project G.e.e.K.e.R. (1996) (TV series) (co-creator)
The Weekenders (2000) (TV series)
Dave the Barbarian (2004) (TV series) (creator)
A Tale Dark & Grimm (2021) (TV series) (co-creator, alongside Simon Otto)
Samurai Rabbit: The Usagi Chronicles (2022) (TV series) (co-creator)

Actor
Mothman (2000) .... Agent Fulmer
Breathing Room (1998) .... Joe the Bitter Punk
The Mr. Potato Head Show (1998) .... The Writer

Story editor
El Tigre: The Adventures of Manny Rivera (2007) (TV series)
The X's (2005) (TV series)
Ozzy and Drix (2002) (TV series)
The Weekenders (2000) (TV series)
Quack Pack (1996) (TV series)
Aladdin (1994) (TV series)
Darkwing Duck (1991) (TV series)

Voice director
The X's (2005) (TV series)

References

External links
 

1969 births
Living people
American screenwriters
American television producers
American actors
Emmy Award winners
Songwriters from California
Disney Television Animation people